Volk is a surname. It means wolf  in several Slavic languages, and it refers to people in German. German Volk is the cognate of English folk and related to Fulk, French Foulques, Italian Fulco and Swedish Folke, along with other variants such as Fulke, Foulkes, Fulko, Folco and Folquet. Notable people with the surname include:
Amy Volk (born 1969), American politician from Maine
Austin Volk (1918–2010), US politician
Douglas Volk (1856–1935), American portrait and figure painter, muralist, and educator
Emily Volk, American pathologist and hospital administrator
Ernest Volk (1845–1919), German-born US archaeologist
George Herbert Volk (1881–?), British automobile engineer noted as a pioneer builder of seaplanes.
Helen Volk (born 1954), Zimbabwean hockey player
Hermann Volk (1903–88), German Cardinal of the Roman Catholic Church
Igor Volk (1937–2017), USSR cosmonaut and merited test pilot
Jan Volk, Basketball executive
Joe Volk, English musician and songwriter
John Volk (1915–2008), American politician
Karl Volk (1896–1961), Communist politician, journalist and German Resistance fighter
Klaus Volk (born 1944), German criminal lawyer
Leonard Volk (1828–95), US sculptor
Lester D. Volk (1884–1962), American physician, lawyer and politician
Magnus Volk (1851–1937), British electrical engineer
Phil Volk (born 1945), American musician
Rick Volk (born 1945), American footballer
Rita Volk (born 1990), Uzbekistani-American actress and model
Robert Volk (born 1965), Slovenian soccer player
Rodolfo Volk (1906–83), Italian soccer player
Sandra Volk (born 1985), Slovenian tennis player
Stephen Volk (born 1954), British screenwriter
Tyler Volk, professor at NYU
Wilhelm Volk (1804–69), German author who used the pseudonym Ludwig Clarus

Völk
 Christopher Völk (born 1988), German judoka
 Elisabeth Völk (born 1946), after whom asteroid 6189 Völk was named 
 Josef Völk (born 1948), German international ice hockey player

See also 
Volkov (surname)